Tayeqan (also Romanized as Ţāyeqān) is a village in Khurheh Rural District, in the Central District of Mahallat County, Markazi Province, Iran. At the 2006 census, its population was 337, in 128 families.

References 

Populated places in Mahallat County